Barnwell West is a 3.8 hectare Local Nature Reserve in Cambridge. It is managed by Cambridge City Council.

This is a linear site along Coldhams Brook, which is managed to encourage water voles. There are birds such as  kingfishers, redwings and fieldfares, and butterflies include speckled woods and orange tips.

There is access from Barnwell Road and Coldham's Common.

References

Local Nature Reserves in Cambridgeshire